Death Note is a Japanese anime television series based on the manga series of the same name written by Tsugumi Ohba and illustrated by Takeshi Obata. It was directed by Tetsurō Araki at Madhouse and originally aired in Japan on Nippon TV every Tuesday shortly past midnight, effectively from October 4, 2006, to June 27, 2007. The plot of the series primarily revolves around high school student Light Yagami, who decides to rid the world of evil with the help of a supernatural notebook called a Death Note. This book causes the death of anyone whose name is written in it and is passed on to Light by the Shinigami Ryuk after he becomes bored within the Shinigami world.

A two-hour "Director's Cut" compilation television film, titled Death Note: Relight: Visions of a God, aired on NTV a few months after the anime concluded. Although advertised to be the "complete conclusion", the popularity of the series inspired the release of a second TV special, titled Death Note: Relight 2: L's Successors nearly a year later. These specials recap the first and second arcs of the anime, respectively, with new scenes added to fill in any plot holes resulted from omitted footage.

In 2007, Viz Media licensed the series for a bilingual release in North America. Episodes of the series were officially available for download soon after they aired in Japan; according to Viz, this was "significant because it marked the first time a well known Japanese anime property [was] made legally available to domestic audiences for download to own while the title still [aired] on Japanese television." Viz Media began releasing these episodes via Direct2Drive on May 10, 2007. In addition to this downloadable release of a subtitled version of the series, Viz also acquired the rights for the home video release of both the subtitled and dubbed version of the series.

On October 21, 2007, Death Note premiered on Cartoon Network's Adult Swim. Death Note episodes were also added to Adult Swim's streaming video service, Adult Swim Video, on Fridays before airing on television. On November 9, 2008, Death Note began airing weekly, at 3:30 a.m. EST, starting with episode 1, "Rebirth", on Adult Swim. In Canada, the series premiered on YTV's Bionix programming block on October 26, 2007. In October 2007, Hong Kong began airing the Cantonese version of Death Note at 12:00 a.m. Saturday nights on TVB. On April 14, 2008, Death Note premiered in Australia, where it aired on ABC2 on Mondays at 9:30 p.m.

Five pieces of theme music are used for the series. The first opening theme, titled "The World", is performed by Nightmare. Nightmare also performed the first ending theme, which reappears as the ending theme in the television film Death Note: Relight: Visions of a God and as an insert in episodes 12 and 19. Both songs appear on their album The World Ruler. Both themes are performed by Maximum the Hormone and appear on their album Bu-ikikaesu. The final episode's ending theme is "Coda ~ Death Note" by series co-composer Yoshihisa Hirano. "Misa's Song", performed by Misa's voice actress Aya Hirano, is heard as an insert for episode 25. The English version of the song is performed by the character's English voice actress, Shannon Chan-Kent.

Episode list

Television films

Home media release

Japanese

English

References

External links
 Official Death Note anime website 
 

mf=yes|Episodes
Death Note